"Are You Ready for the Country?" is a song written by Neil Young and released on his 1972 Harvest album. The track features Young on piano backed by the studio band dubbed The Stray Gators, comprising Jack Nitzsche on slide guitar, Ben Keith on pedal steel guitar, Tim Drummond on bass, and Kenny Buttrey on drums. Backing vocals on the track are by David Crosby and Graham Nash. The recording was made in a studio set up in a barn on Young's ranch.

Lyrics and music
According to Sam Inglis, the "country" in the title is never made explicit, and while certainly not a country like Belgium and it seems like it could be in the United States south like contemporary Young songs "Southern Man" and "Alabama," the lyrics are not explicitly political like those songs.  Rather than addressing issues like racism, the lyrics of "Are You Ready for the Country" are more about generalized dread.  Lyrics like "I was talkin' to the preacher, said, 'God was on my side'/Then I ran into the hangman, he said, 'It's time to die'" imply that there is more to the story, and perhaps a more interesting backstory, than what is explicitly stated, and hint at an organized religion theme. The title may be Young asking his audience if they are willing to follow him into country music, although Inglis states that the arrangement is more blues than country.

Allmusic critic Matthew Greenwald states that the arrangement provides a sense of whimsy, highlighting Young's "funky" piano and Nitzsche's "lazy" slide guitar.  Ken Bielen describes the melody as "punchy" and says it works well with the song's "sing-a-long vocal character."  Bielen also comments on the "rustic" quality added by Nitzsche's slide guitar.

Critical reception
Rolling Stone Magazine critic John Mendelsohn said the song seemed like "an in-joke throwaway intended for the amusement of certain of Neil's superstar pals."

Waylon Jennings version
The song was released as a single by American country music artist Waylon Jennings in 1976, the second single from the album named after the song, Are You Ready for the Country. Jennings changed the lyrics of the chorus from "Are you ready for the country/Because it's time to go" to "Are you ready for the country?/Are you ready for me?"  The Jennings single reached #7 on the Billboard Hot Country Singles & Tracks chart.

Chart performance

Waylon Jennings

Hank Williams, Jr. featuring Eric Church

References

1972 songs
1976 singles
2015 singles
Neil Young songs
Waylon Jennings songs
Hank Williams Jr. songs
Eric Church songs
Songs written by Neil Young
Song recordings produced by Elliot Mazer
Reprise Records singles
RCA Records singles
Big Machine Records singles
Song recordings produced by Neil Young